The Kawasaki H2 Mach IV was a 750 cc 3-cylinder two-stroke production motorcycle manufactured by Kawasaki. The H2 was a Kawasaki triple sold from September 1971 through 1975.

A standard, factory produced H2 was able to travel a quarter mile from a standing start in 12.0 seconds. It handled better than the Mach III that preceded it. By the standards of its time, its handling was sufficient to make it the production bike to beat on the race track. Nonetheless, its tendency to pull wheelies and a less than solid feel through high speed corners led to adjustments to the design as it evolved. More than any other model, it created Kawasaki's reputation for building what motorcycle journalist Alastair Walker called, "scarily fast, good-looking, no holds barred motorcycles", and led to a further decline in the market place of the British motorcycle industry.

History
In September 1971 the H2 was a direct result of the success of the 500 cc Kawasaki H1 Mach III introduced in 1969. This made it the fastest accelerating motorcycle in production. This was an entirely new engine and not a bored-out 500. Unlike the H1 500, the 750 had much more low engine speed torque, with a strong burst of power starting at 3,500 rpm to the 7,500 rpm red line.

The 1972 H2 came with a single front disc brake, a second disc brake was an optional Kawasaki part, an all-new capacitor discharge ignition system unique to the H2, a chain oiler, and two steering dampers; one friction and one hydraulic.

In 1973, there were minor mechanical changes made to the carburetor jets, oil injection pump and cylinder port timing in an effort by the factory to get more MPG from the H2A. Because of these changes the most powerful H2 was the 1972 model.

In 1974 the H2B engine was modified for more civilized performance at the expense of raw power. The race tail was slimmed down from the previous year. An oil-based steering damper and check valve were added. The oil injection system was substantially changed with two separate sets of injection lines, unlike the earlier models with one set of lines. Oil was injected into the carburetors on a separate line. The oil injection to the bottom end bearings (both main and rod big ends) was retained as a single branched line. A longer swingarm improved stability.

The H2B and H2C had the steering damper repositioned to the left.

In 1972, the H2, as well as the 350 cc S2 Mach II, had a race tail that held the taillight, and had a small storage space.

See also
List of fastest production motorcycles
List of motorcycles by type of engine

Notes

References
Weekblad Motor 1971 pages 1515 and 1516, 1760-1762
 

Standard motorcycles
H2 Mach IV
Two-stroke motorcycles